Yonder Daniel Silva Vargas (born 23 March 1997) is a Venezuelan footballer who plays for São João Ver as a forward.

References

1997 births
Living people
Venezuelan footballers
Association football forwards
Deportivo La Guaira players
Estudiantes de Caracas players
Metropolitanos FC players
SC São João de Ver players
Venezuelan Primera División players
Venezuelan expatriate footballers
Expatriate footballers in Portugal
Venezuelan expatriate sportspeople in Portugal
Footballers from Caracas